Koteshwor is a place, located in Kathmandu District. In 1991, Kathmandu Metropolitan City was expanded by incorporating Koteshwor as Ward No. 32 (previously 35). It encompasses 395 hectares and is bounded by the Manohara river in the east and south, the Bagmati river in the west, and share borders with Gothatar in the north, Madhyapur Thimi municipality of Bhaktapur District in east and Lalitpur metropolitan city in the south. With respect to basic services, almost all homes in the ward have access to electricity, but the same cannot be said about drinking water. At the time of the 1991 Nepal census it had a population of 5,787 living in 1,154 households.
The ward contains 8,716 households. The population in 2001 was 35,184.

History
The name of Koteshwor was derived from the name of shiva temple, Koteshwor Mahadev. At the time of Malla period the Koteshwor was a tri-border area along the junction of three Malla Kingdoms were Kantipur, Patan and Bhaktapur. Initially the settlement of people started from Koteshwor Mahadevsthan area.

Education and institutions

Colleges and Schools
 Koteshwor Multiple Campus - The oldest campus of the city, which is located in Koteshwor Mahadev. This campus has played a vital role on the higher education history of Nepal. Established in 1947, Koteshwor Multiple Campus stands synonymous to the academic institution itself-largely because it was the first step in the mammoth growth of the institution and also because the corporate identity of the stakeholders is reflected in the name of public campus.
 V.S. Niketan Higher Secondary School - V.S. Niketan is located in Minbhawan and Tinkune, Kathmandu, Nepal and schools over 4,000 students. You will find the entire campus of V.S. Niketan divided by Bagmati River. V.S. Education Foundation is the outcome of the institutional expansion of an education system aiming to coordinate all the educational activities of the institution so that the entity established at V.S. Niketan is uniformly maintained in all levels of teaching and learning under the same roof. The institution function form Pre-Primary to Bachelor's Levels of education. It has been awarded the "Best School of Nepal" for two times, recently. 
 CCRC - The Capital College and Research Centre (CCRC) is a Nepali higher secondary school located in Koteshwor, Kathmandu.
 Everest College of Nursing - Everest College of Nursing (ECON) was established in 2010 with the vision of producing Health Professionals that could meet the demands of modern-day medicinal practice. Professionals need to be aware of advances in medical technologies.
 Kathmandu Barsha Higher Secondary School and College - Also known as KATHMANDU BARSHA located in Tinkunne, Koteshwor, Kathmandu.
 Manakamana English Boarding School located as Koteshwor, Sahayogi Nagar.
 Triton International College - located in Subidha Nagar, Tinkunne.
 Nagarik College of Health Sciences - located at Koteshwor.
 Grammar Public Higher Secondary School - Grammar Public Higher Secondary School is located at Setiopi Marga, Koteshwor, Kathmandu-35. Grammar Public Higher Secondary School was established in 1993.
 Kanjirowa National School - Kanjirowa National Higher Secondary School (formerly Kathmandu Don Bosco High School) is an independent co-educational institution. It was established in 1998 A.D by a team of educators and academicians. It is located at Koteshwor (Near Balkumari Bridge), Kathmandu, Nepal.
 Himalaya English Boarding Higher Secondary School - located at Koteshwor.
 Laligurans Batika Secondary School - LGBS is a co-educational institution. It was established in 1979 A.D. It is located at Bidhyanagar, Narephant, Koteshwor, Kathmandu, Nepal. Laligurans Batika Secondary School provides classes from 1 to 10.
 SOS Balgram, Koteshwor - SOS koteshwor is next to Mahadevsthan and is located in Bāgmatī Zone, Central Region, Nepal.
 Kotdevi Public School, Narephat Jagriti Academy, Narephat Mount SEB Boarding School, Narephat Brain Heart English School, Narephat Hospitals 
  Kantipur Hospital Pvt. Ltd. ''' - The Kantipur Hospital Private Limited was established in 2054 BS.

Shopping Mall
Koteshwor, Kathmandu is developing as a hub center for the shopping Malls.

Banks
Most of the major banks and financial institutions have their Branches in the area of Koteshwor, Kathmandu.
 Kumari Bank
 Prabhu Bank
 Sunrise Bank
 Prime Bank
 Global IME Bank Limited
 Citizens Bank
 Siddhartha Bank
 Century Commercial Bank
 Agriculture Development Bank
 Jyoti Bikas Bank
 Janata Bank Nepal Limited
 NMB Bank Limited
 Nepal Credit and Commerce Bank
 Nepal Bank
 Nabil Bank way to mahadevsthan 
 NIC Asia Bank near Tinkune
 NIC Asia Bank Narephat
 Machhapuchchhre Bank
 Kailash Bikas Bank
 Everest Bank Jadibuti
 lumbini Bikas Bank Narephat
 Rastriya Banijya Bank 15-20m near overhead bridge(way to bhatbhateni)

See also
Bagmati River
Koteshwor Mahadev
Kathmandu
Kathmandu Metropolitan City

References

Populated places in Kathmandu District
Neighbourhoods in Kathmandu